Daviesia apiculata is a species of flowering plant in the family Fabaceae and is endemic to the south-west of Western Australia. It is an erect, bushy shrub with scattered, erect phyllodes with a point on the end, and yellow flowers with a red tinge.

Description

Taxonomy and naming
Daviesia apiculata was first formally described in 1995 by Michael Crisp in Australian Systematic Botany from specimens he collected near Israelite Bay in 1979. The specific epithet (apiculata) means "ending abruptly in a small point", referring to the leaves.

Distribution and habitat
This species of pea mainly grows in kwongan in two disjunct populations; one between Narembeen, Wickepin, Lake Grace and Hyden, the other between Salmon Gums, Esperance and Israelite Bay.

Conservation status
Daviesia apiculata is classified as "not threatened" by the Government of Western Australia Department of Biodiversity, Conservation and Attractions.

References

apiculata
Eudicots of Western Australia
Plants described in 1995
Taxa named by Michael Crisp